Mason Lake is a naturally occurring mountain lake located between Mount Defiance and Bandera Mountain near Snoqualmie Pass, King County, Washington. Accessible only by hike via the  Mason Lake Trail (also known as "Ira Spring Memorial Trail"), splits to Mount Defiance trail while continuing past the Island Lakes towards Pratt Lake trail at Olallie Lake's north shore. Mason Lake is at an elevation of t.

See also 
 List of lakes of the Alpine Lakes Wilderness

References 

Lakes of King County, Washington
Mount Baker-Snoqualmie National Forest